Zinino (Bashkir and ) is a rural locality (a settlement) in Ufa, Bashkortostan, Russia. The population was 369 as of 2010. There are 16 streets.

Geography 
Zinino is located 17 km southeast of Ufa. Nagayevo is the nearest rural locality.

References 

Rural localities in Ufa urban okrug